LTT is an initialism for the following:

Libya Telecom & Technology
Light the Torch, an American Rock Band formerly as Devil You Know
Linux Trace Toolkit, for tracing computer program execution
Lithuanian talonas, ISO 4217 code
Lokmanya Tilak Terminus, a railway terminus in Mumbai, India
Luyten Two-Tenths catalogue, a catalog of proper motions for stars
Linus Tech Tips, a Canadian tech-related YouTube channel